Ihor Tymchenko (born 16 January 1986) is a professional Ukrainian football striker.

Career
Throughout his career, he played in such teams as Elektron Romny, Uholyok Dymytrov, Lokomotiv Moscow (reserves), Obolon Kyiv, Spartak Sumy, Stal Alchevsk, Metalurh Donetsk, Zakarpattia Uzhhorod, Vorskla Poltava, Chornomorets Odesa and Krymteplytsia Molodizhne.

References 
Profile on Official Metalurh Donetsk Website
Profile on Football Squads
Profile on EUFO

1986 births
Living people
Sportspeople from Poltava
Ukrainian footballers
Ukrainian expatriate footballers
Expatriate footballers in Russia
FC Elektron Romny players
FC Metalurh Donetsk players
FC Obolon-Brovar Kyiv players
FC Obolon-2 Kyiv players
FC Chornomorets Odesa players
FC Stal Alchevsk players
FC Vorskla Poltava players
FC Uholyok Myrnohrad players
FC Hoverla Uzhhorod players
FC Poltava players
FC Krymteplytsia Molodizhne players
FC Tytan Armyansk players
FC Hirnyk Kryvyi Rih players
FC Desna Chernihiv players
FC Kremin Kremenchuk players
Association football forwards
FC Lokomotiv Moscow players
Sportspeople from Donetsk Oblast